Ponmudi is a 1950 Tamil-language film directed by Ellis R. Dungan. It was based on the Tamil poet Bharathidasan's verse novel Ethirparatha Mutham.

Plot 
Ponmudi was a love story based on the Bharathidasan novel Edhirparatha Mutham.

Production 
Producer T. R. Sundaram of Modern Theatres wanted to make a film based on Edhirparatha Mutham (lit. Unexpected Kiss) – a novel written by the Tamil rationalist poet Bharatidasan. Ellis Dungan was hired to direct Bharathidasan's script. The film was made at the Modern Theatres studio in Salem. Some scenes were also filmed in Yercaud. For shooting beach scenes, Dungan had a beach set constructed in Salem, out of sand brought from Adyar beach. Music was composed by G. Ramanathan and lyrics were written by Marudhakasi-Ka. Mu. Sheriff. Most of the songs were copied from popular Hindi movie tunes. P. V. Narasimha Bharathi and Madhuri Devi were cast in the lead roles and M. G. Chakrapani as the villain. The film had intimate love sequences which were unusual in the (then) conservative Tamil film industry.

Cast 

Male cast
 Narsimha Bharathi
 R. Balasubramaniam
 Chakrapani
 Kali N. Rathnam
 Alwar Kuppusami
 Rama Krishnan
 K. K. Perumal
 Karunanidhi
 Ezhumalai

Female cast
 Madhuri Devi
 Saraswathi
 Dhanalakshmi
 Muthulakshmi
 Lalitha
Dance
 Lalitha-Padmini
 Sinha-Party

Release and reception 
Ponmudi was released on Pongal day (14 January) 1950. It was a commercial failure as its intimate scenes shocked the Tamil audience. The film was criticised in the press for being "vulgar" and Dungan was accused of "corrupting the population with American ways".J. G. Vijayam's cinematography was acclaimed and won him an award.

Soundtrack 
The music was composed by G. Ramanathan while the lyrics were penned by Ka. Mu. Sheriff and A. Maruthakasi.
Partial list of songs from Ponmudi :

References

External links 
 

1950 films
1950s Tamil-language films
Films based on poems
Films directed by Ellis R. Dungan
Films scored by G. Ramanathan
Indian black-and-white films